L'Écho du Katanga ('The Echo of Katanga') was a French-language weekly newspaper published from Elisabethville, Congo-Leopoldville. l'Écho du Katanga was founded in 1929 by Jean Decoster. It replaced Journal du Katanga, which had been founded in 1911. The newspaper promoted European settlement in Congo. Later Decoster's son, Albert Decoster, took over the post as the editor of l'Écho du Katanga.

L'Écho du Katanga was closed down in 1962.

See also
 Media of the Democratic Republic of the Congo

References

Defunct weekly newspapers
French-language newspapers published in Africa
Newspapers published in the Democratic Republic of the Congo
Publications established in 1931
Publications disestablished in 1962
Lubumbashi
1931 establishments in the Belgian Congo
Katanga Province